A Time for Us may refer to:

Music
 "Love Theme from Romeo and Juliet", also known as "A Time for Us", an instrumental arranged by Henry Mancini, from Nino Rota's music for the 1968 film Romeo and Juliet
 A Time for Us (Donny Osmond album), 1973
 A Time for Us (Joey Yung album), 2009
 A Time for Us (Luke Kennedy album), 2013

Television
 A Flame in the Wind, an American soap opera, renamed A Time for Us in 1965
 Kahit Isang Saglit, a 2008 telenovela in the Philippines, Malaysia, and Singapore